Michael David Bates (born 11 October 1983) is a New Zealand cricketer. He is a left-arm, medium-pace bowler who bats right-handed. He was a member of the New Zealand Under 19 side in the 2002 Under 19 Cricket World Cup, and has played for the Auckland Aces since 2003. Bates has the record of most runs conceded in a game of domestic Twenty20 cricket with 64 runs scored off his 4 overs bowled, although getting 3 wickets in his last over.

International career
Bates made his ODI and T20I debut for the New Zealand Blackcaps in February 2012 against Zimbabwe. He is the brother of former All Black Steven Bates.

References

1983 births
Living people
New Zealand cricketers
New Zealand One Day International cricketers
New Zealand Twenty20 International cricketers
Auckland cricketers
Cricketers from Auckland